Satanic Art is an EP by Norwegian black metal band Dødheimsgard. It was released in May 1998, by Moonfog Productions. Satanic Art marks the beginning of Dødheimsgard's transition from black metal to a more industrial/avant-garde sound, which was not fully realized until their next album, 666 International (1999).

It was Dødheimsgard's first release to feature Svein Egil Hatlevik (Fleurety) on keyboards, their only one to feature Galder (Dimmu Borgir, Old Man's Child) on guitars and the last to feature Cerberus on bass.

The samples used in the songs "Traces of Reality" and "Wrapped in Plastic" are both taken from the TV series Twin Peaks.

Critical reception

William York of AllMusic said the album is "more than just a transitional effort, Satanic Art stands on its own as a daring, defiant piece of work".

Track listing

Personnel

Dødheimsgard
 Mr. Always Safe and Sound/Aldrahn (Bjørn Dencker Gjerde) – guitars, vocals
 Mr. Anti-Evolution Human Deviation/Galder (Thomas Rune Andersen Orre) – guitars
 Mr. Dingy Sweet Talker Women Stalker (Svein Egil Hatlevik) – keyboards
 Mr. Nebulous Secrets/Apollyon (Ole Jørgen Moe) – drums, percussion
 Mr. Dead Meat Smelly Feet/Cerberus – bass
 Mr. Fantastic Deceptionist/Vicotnik (Yusaf Parvez) – guitars, programming, vocals (4)

Additional personnel
 Stine Lunde – violins (2)
 Garm (Kristoffer Rygg) – mastering
 Tom "Thrawn" Kvålsvoll – mastering
 Bjørn Boge – production, engineering, mixing
 Bjørn Werner – additional mixing

References

1998 EPs
Dødheimsgard albums
Black metal EPs